Duncan Chisholm (born 31 October 1968) is a Scottish fiddle player and composer. He has released seven solo albums as a solo artist. His studio album, Affric, released in 2012, was longlisted for the Scottish Album of the Year (SAY) Award. In 2022, he released a seventh studio album, titled Black Cuillin. He tours with the Scottish Gaelic singer Julie Fowlis' band. He is also a founder member of the folk rock group Wolfstone. He played fiddle for Runrig.

Discography

Solo
Redpoint (1997)
The Door of Saints (2001)
Farrar (2008)
Canaich (2010)
Affric (2012)
Live at Celtic Connections (2013)
Sandwood (2018)
Black Cuillin (2022)

with Wolfstone
Unleashed (1991)
The Chase (1992)
Year of the Dog (1994)
The Half Tail (1996)
Pick of the Litter (1997)
Seven (1999)
Not Enough Shouting (2000)Almost an Island (2002)Terra Firma (2007)

Guest appearancesAcross the City and the World – Donnie Munro (2002)Proterra – Runrig (2003)Day of Days – Runrig (2004)Heart of America – Donnie Munro (2006)Everything You See – Runrig (2007)Uam – Julie Fowlis (2009)The Beat of You – Coast (2010)Live at Perthshire Amber – Julie Fowlis (2011)
"Uncovered" - Beth Nielsen Chapman (2013)
"Party on the Moor" - Runrig (2014)
"Gach Sgeul" - Julie Fowlis (2014)
"Alterum" - Julie Fowlis (2017)

Awards
MG Alba Scots Trad Music Awards – Album of the Year 2008 – Farrar Herald Angel – Edinburgh Festival – for multi-media production Kin
 Scots Trad Music Awards –  Musician of the Year 2012
 Scots Trad Music Awards – Album of the Year 2014 – Live at Celtic Connections''
 Scots Trad Music Awards – Album of the Year 2018 - 'Sandwood'

References

External links 
 SoundCloud page

1968 births
Living people
Scottish fiddlers
British male violinists
People from Inverness
Wolfstone members
Blazin' Fiddles members
21st-century violinists
21st-century British male musicians